Mualang may be,

Mualang people
Mualang language